Cash on Demand is a 1961 British black and white neo noir crime thriller film directed by Quentin Lawrence and starring Peter Cushing and André Morell. The film company Hammer Film Productions invested approximately £37,000 to produce the film. To optimise its budget the film uses a limited number of sets; an interior street set, the trading area of a bank, the manager's office, the stairway between office and the vault, and the interior of the vault itself. The screenplay was adapted from the 1960 Theatre 70 teleplay The Gold Inside, also directed by Lawrence, and featuring André Morell and Richard Vernon in the same roles.

Columbia Pictures began distribution of the film in the United States on 20 December 1961, and screenings continued until April in some major cities.

Plot
Two days before Christmas, a bogus insurance investigator, Gore Hepburn, brazenly conducts a con trick on a bank, largely through making Fordyce the bank manager believe that his family have been kidnapped.

Fordyce is a cold, officious man; for instance, he has previously threatened his head clerk, Pearson, with dismissal for a misdemeanour, despite the fact that this would end Pearson's career. Gore Hepburn recognises the insecurities underlying Fordyce's behaviour and exploits them ruthlessly, tormenting him with veiled threats.

Feeling that he has no choice, Fordyce helps Gore Hepburn to steal £93,000 in banknotes from the bank vault, concealing his actions from the rest of the staff. However, they have already phoned Gore Hepburn's insurance company as a routine precaution, and discovered that he is an imposter.

When Fordyce learns that the police are on their way he becomes desperate for his family's safety. When police arrive Fordyce convinces Pearson to cover for him and excuse their contacting them as a misplaced cheque.

Fordyce offers police a drink of whisky, as it is Christmas. However, police have already arrested Col Gore Hepburn, who has a case containing the bank's money. Gore Hepburn is not his real name; he is a known criminal. Police realise he must have had inside help with the robbery, which points to Fordyce.

A quick call establishes that Fordyce's family were never under threat. The police are unclear as to why Fordyce would have believed this, suspecting instead that he helped the supposed colonel of his own free will.

Fordyce tries to convince the police that the colonel deceived him; for instance, by ordering him at one point to stand by the window and mop his brow, as a signal to a supposed associate outside. As he demonstrates this to the officers, a sealed bank package of £500 (which Gore Hepburn had slipped into his pocket earlier) falls out. Once more the police are sceptical of his innocence. Gore Hepburn tells the police that Hepburn and another man used a tape recorder to disguise their voices and make it seem like Fordyce's family was kidnapped, and that Fordyce is innocent.

Fordyce is finally seen as innocent and the police let him go because he was trying to protect his family. Knowing his wife and son are safe, he has changed his opinion of his co-workers for helping him. He goes to the police station with them to talk to his wife and to Hepburn for deceiving him.  With a half-smile on his face, he tells Pearson to manage the bank in his absence, assuring him he will be back in a few hours and join them at the staff Christmas party.

Cast
 Peter Cushing as Harry Fordyce
 André Morell as Colonel Gore Hepburn (as Andre Morell)
 Richard Vernon as Pearson
 Norman Bird as Arthur Sanderson
 Kevin Stoney as Detective Inspector Bill Mason
 Barry Lowe as Peter Harvill
 Edith Sharpe as Miss Pringle
 Lois Daine as Sally 
 Alan Haywood as Kane

Critical reception
Cash on Demand was selected by the film historians Steve Chibnall and Brian McFarlane as one of the 15 most meritorious British B films made between the Second World War and 1970. They note that it also received enthusiastic reviews at the time of its release from The Monthly Film Bulletin and Kinematograph Weekly. They particularly praise Peter Cushing: "Above all, it is Peter Cushing's performance of the austere man, to whom efficiency matters most (though the film is subtle enough to allow him a certain integrity as well), and who will be frightened into a warmer sense of humanity, that lifts the film well above the perfunctory levels of much 'B' film-making."

See also
 List of Christmas films

References

External links
 
 
 

1961 films
1960s Christmas films
1961 crime drama films
1960s crime thriller films
1960s heist films
British black-and-white films
British Christmas films
British crime drama films
British crime thriller films
British heist films
Columbia Pictures films
Film noir
Films about bank robbery
Films based on television plays
Films directed by Quentin Lawrence
Films shot at Bray Studios
Hammer Film Productions films
1960s English-language films
1960s British films